Idalgashinna Railway Station (ඉදල්ගස්හින්න දුම්රිය ස්ථානය)) is the 68th station on the Main Line,and fifth highest railway station in sri lanka located between Haputale and Ohiya railway stations in Badulla District, Uva Province. The station was built after the track was extended in 1893, from the Nanu Oya railway station to Haputale. This is the 68th railway station on the Colombo-Badulla railway line. The railway station is located on a hilltop separating the southern and eastern parts of Sri Lanka. Because of this the environment is constantly foggy and instantly clear. Depending on the location, rainwater from the Idalgashinna railway station collects in front of the roof to the Mahaweli river valley and water falling from the back of the roof to the Walawe river valley.

The  broad gauge main line between Haputale and Idalgashinna is regarded to have a notably scenic view due to the land falling away steeply both sides. The view on the northern side of the station extends beyond Boralanda and Welimada up to Udupussellawa and Hakgala, with the southern side encompassing Beragala down to the coast at Hambantota and the Udawalawa reservoir clearly visible.

It is serviced by the express trains such as Podi Menike, Udarata Menike and Night mail train, as well as all local trains running on the  main line.

There are 14 tunnels between the Ohiya and Idalgashinna railway stations.

Continuity

See also
 List of railway stations in Sri Lanka
 List of railway stations by line order in Sri Lanka

References

Railway stations in Badulla District
Railway stations on the Main Line (Sri Lanka)
Railway stations opened in 1893